The 1977–78 daytime network television schedule for the three major English-language commercial broadcast networks in the United States covers the weekday and weekend daytime hours from September 1977 to August 1978.

Talk shows are highlighted in  yellow, local programming is white, reruns of older programming are orange, game shows are pink, soap operas are chartreuse, news programs are gold, children's programs are light purple and sports programs are light blue. New series are highlighted in bold.

PBS, the Public Broadcasting Service, was in operation, but the schedule was set by each local station.

Schedule

Monday-Friday

Notes
 Programs aired before 9:00AM aired at the same time in all time zones. CBS's Sunrise Semester was a half-hour program which aired at either 6:00 or 6:30 AM, depending on the station.
 Programs scheduled after 10:00 AM Eastern aired one hour earlier (starting at 9:00 AM) in the Central and Pacific time zones. Stations in the Mountain time zone that started their network schedule at 8:00 AM would follow the Central and Pacific pattern that year.
 Some network programs, particularly before 7:00 AM and after 10:00/9:00 AM, were subject to preemption by local affiliate stations in favor of syndicated or locally produced programs.
 On ABC, ABC Evening News / World News Tonight was produced at 6:00 PM Eastern/5:00 PM Central, and aired live by some affiliates. This early feed of the broadcast was discontinued in 1982.
 A CBS News Razzmatazz special would occasionally preempt CBS' 4:00PM show.

Saturday

In the News aired ten times during CBS' Saturday morning shows.

Sunday

By network

ABC

Returning Series
The $20,000 Pyramid
ABC Evening News
All My Children
American Bandstand
Animals, Animals, Animals
The Better Sex
The Edge of Night
Family Feud
General Hospital
Good Morning America
The Great Grape Ape Show 
Happy Days 
Issues and Answers
Jabberjaw 
The Krofft Supershow
One Life to Live
Ryan's Hope
Schoolhouse Rock!

New Series
ABC Weekend Special
ABC World News Tonight
The All-New Super Friends Hour
Scooby's All-Star Laff-A-Lympics

Not Returning From 1976-77
The Don Ho Show
Hot Seat
Junior Almost Anything Goes!
The Mumbly Cartoon Show
The New Adventures of Gilligan 
The Oddball Couple 
The Scooby-Doo/Dynomutt Hour
Second Chance 
Super Friends 
The Tom and Jerry Show

CBS

Returning Series
All in the Family 
Ark II 
As the World Turns
The Bugs Bunny/Road Runner Hour
Camera Three
Captain Kangaroo
CBS Children's Film Festival
CBS Evening News
CBS Morning News
Face the Nation
Fat Albert and the Cosby Kids 
The Ghost Busters 
Guiding Light
Here's Lucy 
Lamp Unto My Feet
Look Up and Live
Love of Life
Match Game
The New Adventures of Batman 
The Price Is Right
Search for Tomorrow
The Secrets of Isis 
Speed Buggy 
Sunrise Semester
Tarzan, Lord of the Jungle
Tattletales
The Young and the Restless

New Series
The Batman/Tarzan Adventure Hour
The New Tic Tac Dough
Pass the Buck
The Robonic Stooges
Space Academy
The Skatebirds
Wacko
What's New, Mr. Magoo?

Not Returning From 1976-77
Clue Club
Double Dare
Far Out Space Nuts 
Gambit
The Hudson Brothers Razzle Dazzle Show 
Shazam!
Way Out Games

NBC

Returning Series
Another World
Chico and the Man 
Days of Our Lives
The Doctors
The Gong Show
High RollersThe Hollywood Squares
Hong Kong Phooey 
Land of the Lost 
Meet the Press
NBC Nightly News
NBC Saturday Night News
NBC Sunday Night News
Think Pink Panther
Sanford and Son 
Today
Wheel of FortuneNew SeriesI Am the Greatest: The Adventures of Muhammad AliAmerica Alive!Baggy Pants and the NitwitsCard SharksCB BearsThe Go-Go Globetrotters For Richer, For PoorerKnockoutThe New Archie and Sabrina HourThe Red Hand GangSearch and Rescue: The Alpha TeamSpace SentinelsThunderTo Say the LeastNot Returning From 1976-77'50 Grand SlamBig John, Little JohnIt's Anybody's GuessThe Kids From C.A.P.E.R.Lovers and FriendsMcDuff, the Talking DogMonster SquadMuggsyName That TuneShoot for the StarsSomersetStumpers!''

See also
1977-78 United States network television schedule (prime-time)
1977-78 United States network television schedule (late night)

Sources
https://web.archive.org/web/20071015122215/http://curtalliaume.com/abc_day.html
https://web.archive.org/web/20071015122235/http://curtalliaume.com/cbs_day.html
https://web.archive.org/web/20071012211242/http://curtalliaume.com/nbc_day.html

United States weekday network television schedules
1977 in American television
1978 in American television